Toby Trister Gati (born 1946) was the United States Assistant Secretary of State for Intelligence and Research from 1993 to 1997.

Early life

Toby T. Gati was born into a jewish family originally from Russia

Education

Toby T. Gati was educated at Pennsylvania State University, receiving a B.A. in Russian Literature and Language in 1967. She then attended Columbia University, receiving an M.A. in 1970, Master of International Affairs in 1972, and a certificate from the Harriman Institute.

Career 
A Russian expert, Gati published several articles on the politics and foreign policy of the Soviet Union and the Russian Federation and on U.S.–Russian relations. She was Senior Vice President of the United Nations Association of the United States of America and in this capacity oversaw the organization's research on international political, economic and security issues.

In January 1993, Gati became a Special Assistant to the President and Senior Director for Russia, Ukraine, and the Eurasian States at the United States National Security Council. She left this position in June 1993.

President of the United States Bill Clinton then nominated Gati as Assistant Secretary of State for Intelligence and Research and Gati held this office from November 5, 1993 until May 31, 1997. She told the former US ambassador, Samantha Power: "Ethnic cleansing was not a priority of our policy. When you make an original decision you are not going to respond, then I'm sorry, these things are going to happen."

Since leaving government service, Gati has worked as a consultant with Akin Gump Strauss Hauer & Feld, an international law firm.

Since 2016, she has been a President of TTG Global LLC. She is also an independent board member at Lukoil.

Since 2016, she has served as a director/trustee of the School of Civic Education in London. The School was originally founded as the School of Political Studies in Moscow in 1992, which led to a proliferation of such schools across Central and Eastern Europe. These formed into an Association of Schools of Political Studies to train future generations of political, economic, social and cultural leaders in countries in transition, under the auspices of the Council of Europe, where it comes under the Education Department of the Directorate of Democratic Participation within the Directorate General of Democracy (“DGII”) of the Council of Europe.

References

Archives State Department bio
Profile from Akin Gump

United States Assistant Secretaries of State
Living people
Pennsylvania State University alumni
School of International and Public Affairs, Columbia University alumni
United States National Security Council staffers
Clinton administration personnel
1946 births
Assistant Secretaries of State for Intelligence and Research